Stradisphere Festival is an annual music festival held in Stradbroke, Suffolk, England, in July. It celebrated its 5th year in 2018 with headliners Badly Drawn Boy and Sam and the Womp.

The festival was founded by Brett and Jo Baber in 2014. Until 2018 the festival mostly had smaller and tribute bands performing, but has expanded and aspires to be 'a premier family music festival'.

To advertise the 2018 festival, organisers promoted the festival across Suffolk using a person dressed as a spaceman who visited local businesses and posed for photos in well-known locations.

References

Music festivals in Suffolk
Stradbroke